James Shannon may refer to:

People
James Shannon (Massachusetts politician) (born 1952), US Representative from Massachusetts
James Shannon (academic) (1799–1859), president of the University of Missouri
James Shannon (Australian politician) (1840–1891)
James Jebusa Shannon (1862–1923), American artist
James Shannon (Irish politician) (died 1933), Irish Labour Party politician represented Wexford in 1927
James Royce Shannon (1881–1946), Irish-American composer and lyricist
James C. Shannon (1896–1980), U.S. politician
James A. Shannon (1904–1994), American physician, head of National Institutes of Health
James Patrick Shannon (1921–2003), American Roman Catholic bishop
Jim Shannon (born 1955), Northern Irish Democratic Unionist politician
James Shannon (cricketer) (born 1990), Irish cricketer

Characters
James Wiley Shannon, an unseen character in In Plain Sight
James "Jim" Shannon, the lead character of Terra Nova